The Euro-Mediterranean Information Society (EUMEDIS) is the principal financial instrument of the European Union for the implementation of the Euro-Mediterranean Partnership activities.  EUMEDIS was initiated in the Barcelona declaration in 1995.  It is a 31 billion euro program.

The support it provides for the Mediterranean countries, as a central part of the EU's role in the world, has three main objectives: 
strengthen political stability and democracy in a common area of peace and security
create an area of shared prosperity and to support the creation of a free trade-area between the EU and the Mediterranean Partners by 2010
create closer ties between people of these countries through cultural, social and human partnership.

References
EUMEDIS projects
EU AID

Economy of the European Union
Foreign relations of the European Union